Richard Dean McCormick (born October 7, 1968) is an American politician and physician. He has represented  in the United States House of Representatives since 2023.

Education and military service
McCormick was born in Las Vegas in 1968 and graduated from Central Catholic High School in Portland, Oregon in 1986. He earned a Bachelor of Science from Oregon State University in 1990. He earned his Master of Business Administration from National University in 1999 and his Doctor of Medicine at Morehouse School of Medicine in 2010.

He served in the United States Marine Corps and United States Navy for over 20 years. In the Marine Corps, he was a helicopter pilot and in the Navy, he reached the rank of commander. He is an emergency physician and works at Gwinnett Medical Center.

Political career
He won the primary election, receiving more than 50% of the vote, avoiding a runoff election. McCormick lost the general election to Democrat Carolyn Bourdeaux.

Following redistricting due to the 2020 U.S. census, McCormick announced his candidacy in the 2022 elections for the newly-redrawn , which became much more Republican-leaning. McCormick and Jake Evans advanced to a runoff election. He defeated Evans in the runoff and won the November 8 general election against Democrat Bob Christian.

Personal life
McCormick's wife, Debra, is an oncologist. They have seven children and live in Suwanee, Georgia.

References

External links
Representative Rich McCormick official U.S. House website
Rich McCormick for Congress

|-

1968 births
21st-century American politicians
Central Catholic High School (Portland, Oregon) alumni
Georgia (U.S. state) Republicans
Oregon State University alumni
Living people
Morehouse School of Medicine alumni
National University (California) alumni
Republican Party members of the United States House of Representatives from Georgia (U.S. state)
United States Marine Corps officers
United States Naval Aviators
United States Navy officers